Kuniyan River, also known as Kuniyan stream, is a river which flows along the border of Kannur and Kasaragod districts in the Indian state of Kerala. It connects the Tejaswini River and the Olavara River which join the Kavvayi Backwaters.

Drainage
It touches Payyannur, Karivellur, Eyyakadu and Trikarpur. It flows through Trikarpur Panchayath, Karivellur-Peralam Panchayath, Payyanur Municipality and Kayyur-Cheemeni Panchayath.

References

Rivers of Kasaragod district
Rivers of Kannur district